Bellante may refer to:

 Bellante, Abruzzo, Italy, a town
 Bellante Stazione, a frazione
 Joseph F. Bellante Jr. (1932–2011), American educator and politician
 Princess Bellante, a character in George Frideric Handel's first opera Almira